Fenn is an unincorporated community in central Alberta in the County of Stettler No. 6, located  west of Highway 56,  east of Red Deer.

Localities in the County of Stettler No. 6